The Große Solstein is a mountain,  high, on the western corner of the Nordkette range in the Karwendel mountains near Zirl in the Austrian state of Tyrol. Its summit may be ascended on various mountain tour routes either from the Solsteinhaus or from the New Magdeburg Hut. These routes are described as not difficult but require stamina. The crossing to the higher peak of the Kleiner Solstein, despite its name the highest in the Nordkette, is described in that article.

Literature

External links 
 
 Tour description

Two-thousanders of Austria
Karwendel
Mountains of Tyrol (state)
Mountains of the Alps
Innsbruck